Tell Sinan, also rendered as Tel/Tall/Tal Sinan, is a Syrian village located in the Salamiyah Subdistrict in Salamiyah District.  According to the Syria Central Bureau of Statistics (CBS), Tell Sinan had a population of 1,061 in the 2004 census. Its inhabitants are predominantly Circassians.

References 

Populated places in Salamiyah District
Circassian communities in Syria
Syrian people of Circassian descent